Acanthocotylidae is a family of monogenean fish skin parasites.

References 

 North American monogenetic trematodes. II. The families Monocotylidae, Microbothriidae, Acanthocotylidae and Udonellidae (Capsaloidea). EW Price - Journal of the Washington Academy of Sciences, 1938
 Myxinidocotyle gen. n. and Lophocotyle Braun (Platyhelminthes, Monogenea, Acanthocotylidae) with descriptions of three new species from hagfishes (Chordata ...G MALMBERG, BO FERNHOLM - Zoologica Scripta, 1989

 Acanthocotylidae at WoRMS

Gyrodactylidea
Platyhelminthes families